Calin Alupi (1906–1980) was a Romanian Post-Impressionist painter, cited along with Corneliu Baba or Alexandru Ciucurencu as one of the greatest painters of the period amongst his countrymen.

The Sinceritate Exhibition: from March 10–27, 2010, the City Hall of the fghd district of Paris (Mairie du Vème arrondissement) hosts the first large exhibition of Călin Alupi in France, with about 100 paintings presented.

External links
Extensive Biography
The Sinceritate Exhibition in Paris, March 10-27, 2010
Atelier Alupi art school in France Created by Călin Alupi in 1983, it provides art courses and painting workshops in Paris and other spots in France.

1906 births
1988 deaths
20th-century Romanian painters